Watchara Buranakruea  (born 8 August 1991) is a Thai badminton player. He won the 2014 Smiling Fish International tournament in the men's doubles event partnered with Trawut Potieng and in the mixed doubles event partnered with Phataimas Muenwong.

Achievements

BWF International Challenge/Series 
Men's doubles

Mixed doubles

  BWF International Challenge tournament
  BWF International Series tournament
  BWF Future Series tournament

References

External links 
 
 

1991 births
Living people
Watchara Buranakruea
Watchara Buranakruea